Augustus Beverley Walter Risman  (born 23 November 1937) is an English former rugby union and rugby league player and rugby league coach. A dual-code international, he played rugby union for England and the British Lions, and rugby league for Great Britain.

Background
Bev Risman was born in Salford, Lancashire, England.

Risman is the son of the rugby league player Gus Risman, the older brother of the rugby league player John Risman, and the father of John M. Risman, who was the first open double Blue. He achieved his double Blue at the University of Oxford, in both the rugby union Varsity Match, and the 1984 rugby league Varsity Match.

Playing career
Bev Risman played rugby union at fly-half for England (8 Test appearances) and for the British Lions (4 Test appearances). His international début was in 1959 for England against Wales. His last international rugby union appearance was in 1961.

Switching codes, he played for Leigh (Heritage No. 694), Leeds and Lancashire. He won both the Challenge Cup and Championship with Leeds and represented Great Britain in 5 Test appearances. He captained the Great Britain squad in the 1968 Rugby League World Cup where he earned three of his caps.

After retiring he became involved in coach education, the development of the game in the South of England and the organisation of student rugby league. He was inducted to the rugby league Roll of Honour in 2005, and was elected President of the Rugby Football League in 2010. He was replaced by Jim Hartley in 2011.

Risman was appointed Officer of the Order of the British Empire (OBE) in the 2012 New Year Honours for services to rugby league.

References

External links
(archived by web.archive.org) Profile at leedsrugby.dnsupdate.co.uk
Rugby league's generation game – article at telegraph.co.uk
Rugby Cup Final 1968

1937 births
Living people
British & Irish Lions rugby union players from England
British rugby league administrators
Dual-code rugby internationals
England international rugby union players
England national rugby league team players
English people of Welsh descent
English rugby league coaches
English rugby league players
English rugby union players
Great Britain national rugby league team captains
Great Britain national rugby league team players
Lancashire rugby league team players
Leeds Rhinos players
Leigh Leopards captains
Leigh Leopards players
London Broncos coaches
Loughborough Students RUFC players
Officers of the Order of the British Empire
Rugby league five-eighths
Rugby league fullbacks
Rugby league players from Salford
Rugby union fly-halves
Rugby union players from Salford